Bieh State (previously named Eastern Bieh State) was a state in South Sudan that existed between 2 October 2015 and 22 February 2020. It was located in the Greater Upper Nile region and it bordered Fangak to the west, Central Upper Nile to the north, Latjoor and Akobo to the east, and Jonglei to the south.

History

On 2 October 2015, President Salva Kiir issued a decree establishing 28 states in place of the 10 constitutionally established states. The decree established the new states largely along ethnic lines. A number of opposition parties and civil society groups challenged the constitutionality of the decree. Kiir later resolved to take it to parliament for approval as a constitutional amendment. In November the South Sudanese parliament empowered President Kiir to create new states.

Administrative divisions
The state consisted of 2 counties:

Nyirol
Uror

References

Greater Upper Nile
States of South Sudan
Bieh
2015 establishments in South Sudan